Pocono Woodland Lakes is a census-designated place located in Dingman Township, Pike County in the state of Pennsylvania.  The community is located between Interstate 84 and Pennsylvania Route 739, and is to the east of and shares a western border with another CDP community, Gold Key Lake.  As of the 2010 census the population was 3,209 residents.

Demographics

References

Census-designated places in Pike County, Pennsylvania
Census-designated places in Pennsylvania